Vance is a town in Orangeburg County, South Carolina, United States. The population was 170 at the 2010 census.

Geography
Vance is located at  (33.436028, -80.419788). According to the United States Census Bureau, the town has a total area of 0.5 square mile (1.3 km2), all land.

Demographics

As of the census of 2000, there were 208 people, 67 households, and 50 families residing in the town. The population density was 414.1 people per square mile (160.6/km2). There were 71 housing units at an average density of 141.4 per square mile (54.8/km2). The racial makeup of the town was 14.42% White, 84.62% African American, 0.48% Native American, and 0.48% from two or more races.

There were 67 households, out of which 35.8% had children under the age of 18 living with them, 41.8% were married couples living together, 31.3% had a female householder with no husband present, and 23.9% were non-families. 22.4% of all households were made up of individuals, and 11.9% had someone living alone who was 65 years of age or older. The average household size was 3.10 and the average family size was 3.65.

In the town, the population was spread out, with 34.1% under the age of 18, 7.7% from 18 to 24, 26.9% from 25 to 44, 18.3% from 45 to 64, and 13.0% who were 65 years of age or older. The median age was 33 years. For every 100 females, there were 80.9 males. For every 100 females age 18 and over, there were 53.9 males.

The median income for a household in the town was $16,250, and the median income for a family was $26,250. Males had a median income of $26,094 versus $11,719 for females. The per capita income for the town was $8,787. About 29.8% of families and 38.5% of the population were below the poverty line, including 60.5% of those under the age of eighteen and 25.9% of those 65 or over.

Notable People
 Nate Snell, former pitcher for the Baltimore Orioles.
 Mike Williams, former collegiate player for Clemson University and current NFL player for the Los Angeles Chargers

References

External links
Information about the Town of Vance from Orangeburg County

Towns in Orangeburg County, South Carolina
Towns in South Carolina